Thaka Thimi Tha is a 2005 Indian Tamil-language romantic comedy film directed by Sundar C. The film stars newcomers Yuva Krishna and Ankitha.

Plot
Krishna (Yuva Krishna) works at an eatery owned by Vivek (Vivek) while Gayathri (Ankitha) is a radio jockey. They are neighbours and both their families begin to quarrel. Their families then start to like each other and become good friends. They decide to arrange the marriage between the young couple but they both refuse and Vivek tells them the reason.

Krishna and Gayathri fell in love with each other in college. From time to time, they were involved in small quarrels but the couple made it up every time. One day, it was the "straw that broke the camel's back": Yuva told his friends about being close to Gayathri and described her, she got angry and they split apart. After finishing college, Gayathri's family moved into a house opposite to that of Yuva.

Their families and Vivek try their best to rejoin them but her relative Sri (Sriman) tries to win her heart and Gayathri even accepts to marry Sri. For the marriage of their friend in their college, Krishna and Gayathri return there. Vivek and their collegemates try to convince Krishna and Gayathri to be together again. Krishna has a change of heart, he convinces her with a song and they eventually reconcile.

Cast

 Yuva Krishna as Krishna
 Ankitha as Gayathri
 Vivek as Vivek
 M. S. Viswanathan as Krishna's grandfather
 Rajeev as Rajesh, Krishna's father
 Manobala as Bala
 Sriman as Sri
 Sai Prashanth as Sehwag, Krishna's friend
 Dev Anand as Deva, Krishna's friend
 Deepak Dinkar as Krishna's friend
 Babloo as Krishna's friend
 Madhan Bob as Devadas
 Vichu Viswanath as Vichu
 Singamuthu as Sri's relative
 Periya Karuppu Thevar as Sri's relative
 Nirosha as Krishna's mother
 Devisri as Gayathri's mother
 Tejashree as Shanthi
 Julie as Julie
 Paravai Muniyamma as Ariyammal
 Zabyn Khan as Rathi Varma
 Shakeela as Rama
 Chelladurai as Watchman
 Cell Murugan as Murugan
 Vellai Subbaiah as Priest

Soundtrack
The soundtrack was composed by D. Imman.

Release  
The film released alongside the low budget films Girivalam and Gurudeva and did not fare well at the box office.

References

External links

2005 films
2000s Tamil-language films
Films directed by Sundar C.